Mundus may refer to:

People
 Mundus (general) (died 536), an East Roman general
 Frank Mundus (1925–2008), an American fisher
 Saint Munde (or Mundus; died c. 962), Scottish abbot in Argyll, Scotland

Places
 Mundus, ancient port in Somaliland on the site of Heis (town)

Popular culture
 Mundus (character), the king of the demon world in the Devil May Cry series of video games
 Mundus (setting), a realm in The Elder Scrolls series of video games

Ancient Roman culture
 Mundus, one of the Latin words for "world"
 Mundus cerialis, a ritual pit connected with the cult of the goddess Ceres

Other
 Erasmus Mundus, the international counterpart of the Erasmus programme
 Mundus furniture, a furniture-manufacturing company

See also
 Mundu, a Malayalam garment